"At Last" is a song written by Mack Gordon and Harry Warren for the musical film Sun Valley Serenade (1941). Glenn Miller and his orchestra recorded the tune several times, with a 1942 version reaching number two on the US Billboard pop music chart.

In 1960, rhythm and blues singer Etta James recorded an arrangement by Riley Hampton that improvised on Warren's original melody. Etta James' rendition was the title track on her debut album At Last! (1960) and was eventually inducted into the Grammy Hall of Fame in 1999. Most recently, Celine Dion and Beyoncé have also had chart successes with the song.

Glenn Miller original renditions
Prior to release of Sun Valley Serenade, "At Last" was performed in the film by Glenn Miller and his orchestra, with vocals by John Payne and Lynn Bari, dubbed by Pat Friday. Studio head Darryl Zanuck reportedly said: "There are too many big ones in this. Let's save one for the next." The "At Last" vocal by Payne and Bari was thus deleted from the film, although instrumental versions remained, including in the Black Ice Ballet finale. The vocal version was included in the movie Orchestra Wives (1942), which also featured the Glenn Miller orchestra. It was sung by Ray Eberle and Bari, again dubbed by Friday.

Unreleased recordings of the song were made in 1941 by Glenn Miller. A new version was recorded by Glenn Miller and His Orchestra in Hollywood on May 20, 1942, and released by RCA Victor Records as a 78 single, backed with the A-side "(I've Got a Gal In) Kalamazoo". The song entered the US Billboard pop music chart (called "Songs with the Most Radio Plugs" at the time) on August 1, 1942, at number 17 and peaked at number two on August 29, 1942. It spent a total of 17 weeks on the chart and later became a musical standard.

The personnel on the 1942 studio recording of "At Last": Ray Eberle (vocals), Billy May, John Best, Steve Lipkins, R.D. McMickle (trumpet), Glenn Miller, Jim Priddy, Paul Tanner, Frank D'Annolfo (trombone), Lloyd "Skip" Martin, Wilbur Schwartz (clarinet, alto saxophone), Tex Beneke, Al Klink (tenor saxophone), Ernie Caceres (baritone saxophone), Chummy MacGregor (piano), Bobby Hackett (guitar), Edward "Doc" Goldberg (string bass), and Maurice Purtill (drums). The arrangement was by Jerry Gray and Bill Finegan.

When RCA Victor issued two 10-inch LP soundtracks to Sun Valley Serenade and Orchestra Wives in 1954, to coincide with the theatrical reissue of the two films, the outtake version of "At Last" from "Sun Valley Serenade" was included, heard for the first time, but the version in Orchestra Wives was not.  This latter rendition was eventually on LP in 1958, in the 20th-Fox double-disc (TCF-100-2) Glenn Miller Compilation of His Original Film Soundtracks.

Wartime release 
The 1942 RCA Victor studio recording of "At Last" by Glenn Miller and his Orchestra featuring Ray Eberle on vocals was released as a U.S. Army V-Disc or Victory Disc by the U.S. War Department during World War II in October 1943 as No. 12A. V-Discs were sent to American soldiers and military personnel overseas.

Later versions
"At Last" has been recorded by many other artists since its original 1940's renditions. Former Glenn Miller Orchestra trumpeter Ray Anthony had the highest charting recording of the song in the U.S. on the pop charts in 1952, peaking at number two on the Billboard pop singles chart and number 20 on the Cashbox chart.  A recording by Gene Watson peaked at number 61 on the Billboard Hot Country Singles & Tracks chart in 1991.

In 2012, Christina Aguilera was invited by Etta James' family to sing "At Last" at James' funeral.  At the funeral, Aguilera stated that James was her idol and inspiration, and that in honour of James, she performs "At Last" at every concert.

Etta James version 

"At Last" became R&B singer Etta James's signature song and was the third in a string of successful songs from her Argo Records debut album  At Last!. In April 1961, it became her second number two R&B hit single and crossed over to pop radio, reaching number 47 on the Billboard Hot 100. Despite its modest pop chart standing, the song is well-known and is still played regularly on oldies radio stations and has become a musical standard.  James' recording also reached number 30 in Cashbox magazine.

James' version, with its passionate vocal and sweeping orchestration, is often used for weddings and wedding receptions.

After one of James' other singles, "Something's Got a Hold on Me", was sampled in two hit singles in 2011 (Avicii's "Levels" and Flo Rida's "Good Feeling"), "At Last" charted in the United Kingdom for the first time at number 69. Following James' death in 2012, the song again rose in the charts and even reached the top 40.

In 2009, James' version was inducted to the Library of Congress' National Recording Registry.

In 2021, it was ranked at No. 115 on Rolling Stone's "Top 500 Greatest Songs of All Time".

Charts

Certifications

Celine Dion version 

"At Last" was covered by Celine Dion and included on her sixth English-language album A New Day Has Come (2002). Her version was produced by Humberto Gatica and Guy Roche and was released as a promotional single in the US on December 9, 2002. There was no associated music video, and it was the last single released from Dion's album.

Commenting on the song, Dion revealed: "I can see beginning my show and looking into everyone's eyes and singing this song. This is my hello."

Dion's "At Last" peaked at number 16 on the Adult Contemporary chart. A live version of this song was included on the A New Day... Live in Las Vegas album in 2004, as Dion performed it for four years during her A New Day... show in Las Vegas. She has also performed the song on several television programs.

Critical reception 
Dion's rendition was critically acclaimed. Frédéric Garat of RFI wrote that the song is "a lovely exercise which reveals the layer of blues hiding underneath the slightly prim and proper petticoats of the 'international star'." Barnes & Noble's Editorial review commented, "Her solid rendition of Etta James's 'At Last' should satisfy her lovelorn fans." Sal Cinquemani of Slant Magazine called it "a soulful rendition."
Chuck Taylor of Billboard said that this "standard" serves her grown-up fans. However, Rob Sheffield of Rolling Stone commented that "she doesn't have the pipes for material defined by Etta James." Ken Tucker of Entertainment Weekly agreed, calling it a "pallid cover."

Charts

Beyoncé version 

"At Last" was also covered by Beyoncé and included on the soundtrack album of the film Cadillac Records (2008). It was released on the soundtrack album on December 2, 2008, through Columbia Records. In the film, Beyoncé actually portrays Etta James. Beyoncé won critical acclaim for her role Cadillac Records and has performed "At Last" several times since the movie was released, including in front of James herself. Beyonce told MTV News: "[Etta James is] one of my heroes, and I always loved her voice, but now knowing what she's been through, she's one of my heroes. I'm not sure if she thought [I would be good] as her. I'm very, very nervous... I actually spoke with her and she told me, 'I loved you from the first time you sung.'" Beyoncé also later told Billboard: "I realized that Etta James was so unapologetic, bold and strong that playing her was a big risk for me. It gave me the confidence and the push to challenge myself a little more with my music."

Critical reception 
John Kehe of The Christian Science Monitor wrote: "No one can channel Etta – she's a singular talent – but Beyoncé does it her own way and conjurs enough emotion and grit to make it work in the context of the movie." A. O. Scott of The New York Times added that Beyoncé's interpretation of "At Last" was "downright revelatory" and described Beyoncé as "a real soul diva of the old school." A writer of Entertainment Weekly wrote that "when she belts out  'At Last,' it all makes sense."

By contrast, Thom Jurek of Allmusic wrote that on "At Last",

This was somewhat echoed by Robert Fontenot of About.com who thought that Beyoncé

Margeaux Watson of Entertainment Weekly also gave a mixed review for the song, writing,

Beyoncé's version of "At Last" won the Grammy Award for Best Traditional R&B Vocal Performance at the 52nd Annual Grammy Awards. On The Village Voices 2008 year-end Pazz & Jop singles list, Beyoncé's version of "At Last" was ranked at number 443.

Live performances 
"At Last" was performed live for the first time by Beyoncé during the 2008 Fashion Rocks on September 5, 2008, as a tribute to James. The live version of the song at the show was later released in 2008. Beyoncé performed the song live at Barack Obama's first dance with his wife Michelle during the Neighbourhood Ball on the night of his inauguration as President of the United States. She told Entertainment Tonight: "To sing 'At Last' while they have their first dance is a dream come true. I could not be more honoured and excited that they have asked me to be part of this moment in history." Jen Chaney of The Washington Post wrote,

Etta James, who was not happy at all, remarked to the audience at a concert from the stage of Seattle's Paramount Theatre a week later:

A week later, she continued savaging Beyoncé's performance by adding

However, she later told the New York Daily News she meant no harm when poked fun at the president and she ripped Beyoncé for her performance of "At Last" during the inauguration; James acknowledged being miffed she was not invited to perform her signature song for Obama's first dance with his wife on inauguration night. The event was telecast live on multiple broadcast and cable television networks. At each of the balls, the Obamas' dance song remained "At Last".

"At Last" was included in the set list of Beyoncé's third concert tour I Am... World Tour (2009–2010). It was performed in the penultimate section of the concert when Beyoncé appeared on stage wearing a long gold sparkly gown with lights at her from all around the arena. During the performance, footage of her performing the song at Obama's inauguration, video images of civil rights era footage, and snippets from her performance of the song in the movie Cadillac Records were all shown on the screens behind her. A writer of South Florida Times praised the video montage saying that it was "beautifully" edited and added that Beyoncé made a "perfect melding" of past and present with the performance of the song. Rolling Stones Caryn Ganz commented that the performance of the song showed a "torchy... display of vocal gymnastics". Jay Lustig of New Jersey On-Line commented that the performances of "At Last" were "as riveting as anything that had come before" during the concert and noted that "Few pop or R&B divas could be as compelling with all the visual hoopla stripped away." Barbara Ellen of The Observer wrote that there was an interesting segment during the performance of "At Last" on the tour. Alice Jones of The Independent wrote that the live rendition of the song was one of the "big-hitters" during the night. A writer of Evening Chronicle wrote that he was "blown away" by the performance while Mike Ross of the website Jam! added that Beyoncé proved she could sing traditional R&B if she wanted with the cover of "At Last". Jay Hanna of The Sunday Times described the performance of the song as truly inspired with Beyoncé simply standing and delivering the song. Jim Farber of the Daily News gave a mixed performance for the song, noting that "Her run at 'At Last' still lacks the terrific sense of relief Etta James manages effortlessly."

Beyoncé also performed "At Last" live at the 2011 Glastonbury Festival on June 26, 2011. During the ITV special A Night With Beyoncé which aired on December 4, 2011, in the United Kingdom, Beyoncé performed "At Last" to a selected crowd of fans. During The Sound of Change Live charity concert held at Twickenham Stadium in London on June 1, 2013, Beyoncé also performed "At Last". Alice Vincent of The Daily Telegraph noted that the cover reflected the event's purpose and proved Beyoncé can "own a big ballad".

 Chart performance 
On the Billboard Jazz Songs chart, Beyonce's "At Last" peaked at number 9, becoming her only song to ever appear on that chart. For the week ending December 17, 2011, Beyoncé's version of "At Last" peaked at number 37 on the UK R&B Chart.Weekly chartsYear-end charts'

Release history

References

1941 songs
1960 singles
2002 singles
2003 singles
2008 singles
2012 singles
Etta James songs
Glenn Miller songs
Nat King Cole songs
Gene Watson songs
Celine Dion songs
Beyoncé songs
American songs
United States National Recording Registry recordings
Blues songs
Songs with music by Harry Warren
Songs with lyrics by Mack Gordon
Grammy Hall of Fame Award recipients
Grammy Award for Best Traditional R&B Vocal Performance
Eva Cassidy songs
Soul ballads
Pop ballads
Songs written for films
RCA Records singles
Argo Records singles
Columbia Records singles
Epic Records singles